Eliseo David Giusfredi (born 2 October 1986) is an Argentine retired football forward.

Career
Giusfredi is a product of River Plate youth academy.

In 2008, he played for Sportakademklub that narrowly avoided relegation from Russian First Division. Giusfredi made his professional debut on 9 August 2008 against Volga Tver and scored a goal that brought his team a draw.

He was in talks with Armenian FC Pyunik early in 2009, but the move has not materialised.

In 2009, he played in second tier football league of Jordan for Al-Ahli (Amman).

In June 2010 due to an injury he had an unsuccessful trial with Costa Rican L.D. Alajuelense.

Giusfredi retired in 2011 to pursue a career in consumer services.

External links
  Profile at stats.sportbox.ru
 Profile at Seton Hall Pirates website

References

 Giusfredi leaves Seton Hall, in talks with Spartak Nalchik
 Best Athlete You've Never Heard of: Eliseo Giusfredi, Seton Hall, Soccer

1986 births
Living people
Argentine footballers
Argentine expatriate footballers
Expatriate footballers in Russia
Expatriate footballers in Jordan
Seton Hall Pirates men's soccer players
Association football forwards
FC Sportakademklub Moscow players